Mormon  is believed by members of the Church of Jesus Christ of Latter-day Saints to be a prophet-historian and a member of a tribe of indigenous Americans known as the Nephites, one of the four groups (including the Lamanites, Jaredites, and Mulekites) described in the Book of Mormon as having settled in the ancient Americas.

According to the Book of Mormon, the prophet Mormon engraved an abridgement of his people's history on golden plates. Based on the chronology described in the book, Mormon lived during the 4th century AD. As a narrator in the text, Mormon presents himself as a redactor. He quotes and paraphrases other writers, collects and includes whole texts by other authors, contributes running commentary, and also writes his own narrative. He writes about the process of making the book, both in terms of compiling the works of other prophets and also in terms of engraving the words on metal plates. He alludes to content that is left out of the book, and refers to a larger collection of records at his disposal.

The Book of Mormon states that Mormon was instructed by the prophet Ammaron where to find the records that had been passed down from their ancestors. It also says that Mormon later abridged the near-millennium-long history of his ancestors, and added additional revelations into the Book of Mormon. Divisions of the book relating to Mormon's personal history are the Words of Mormon and the first seven chapters of the larger book. The book says that Mormon eventually passed all of the records on to his son Moroni.

Life history
According to Mormon's record in the Book of Mormon, he was born in about AD 311 to a father whose name was also Mormon, but was named "after the land of Mormon, the land in which Alma did establish the church among the people". At about the age of ten, he was visited by Ammaron and given instructions on where to find the sacred engravings of the Nephite prophets and what to engrave upon them. At the age of eleven, Mormon was taken to the land of Zarahemla by his father.

Mormon writes that at age fifteen he was visited by Jesus Christ.

In his "sixteenth year," in AD 326, being young but "large in stature", Mormon "was appointed by the people of Nephi" to be the leader of their armies, and fought against the Lamanites in many battles thereafter.

Mormon went to the hill Shim at about the age of 24, as instructed by Ammaron, to take and abridge the Nephite records.

In AD 362, Mormon writes that he "utterly refuse[d]...to be a commander and a leader" to the Nephites "because of their wickedness and abomination". However, about thirteen years later, Mormon decided to return as commander of the Nephite armies as they were being badly beaten by the Lamanites.

Upon returning, Mormon again led them in battle against the Lamanites until the entire destruction of the Nephite nation, which took place as a result of a huge battle fought between the two groups in 385. The prophet Moroni, Mormon's son to whom he delivered the golden plates, records that Mormon was killed by the Lamanites (presumably in AD 385 or shortly thereafter).  As the last prophet and keeper of the record, Moroni is said to have become the angel or messenger who revealed the location of the golden plates to Joseph Smith in 1823.

In AD 385, Mormon witnesses the destruction of the Nephite people and their armies as they battle against the Lamanites (Mormon 6:1). Mormon is 74 years old at the time (AD 385 minus 326 years after the birth of Christ when Mormon said he was 15 years old (16th year), see Mormon 2:2). 15 years later in AD 400 (Mormon 8), Moroni finishes his father's record (Mormon 8:1) and mentions that his father was killed after the battle against the Lamanites at the Hill Cumorah (Mormon 8:3), which would have been after AD 385, making Mormon at least 74 years old when he died.

Meaning of the name
Mormon scholar Hugh Nibley noted the prevalence of names in the Book of Mormon with the root "mor" and suggested that the root may be of Egyptian origin with the meaning of "beloved". However, in the 15 May 1843 issue of the Times and Seasons, Joseph Smith explained the name as being a contraction of the English word "more" and "mon", a word that Smith claimed was Egyptian for "good", making the name literally mean "more good".

See also

Book of Mormon prophets
The Church of Jesus Christ of Latter-day Saints

Notes

Further reading

External links
The Church of Jesus Christ of Latter-day Saints
Official information about The Church of Jesus Christ of Latter-day Saints
Official Scriptures of The Church of Jesus Christ of Latter-day Saints

Book of Mormon prophets